The sixth season of the American dramatic television series Touched by an Angel aired CBS from September 26, 1999 through May 21, 2000, spanning 26 episodes. Created by John Masius and produced by Martha Williamson, the series chronicled the cases of two angels, Monica (Roma Downey) and her supervisor Tess (Della Reese), who bring messages from God to various people to help them as they reach a crossroads in their lives. They are frequently joined by Andrew (John Dye), the angel of death. 

The episodes use the song "Walk with You", performed by Reese, as their opening theme. 

CBS released the sixth season on DVD on September 25, 2012.


Episodes

References

External links
 
 
 

Touched by an Angel seasons
1999 American television seasons
2000 American television seasons